6/9 may refer to:
June 9 (month-day date notation)
September 6 (day-month date notation)